Bhachau railway station is a railway station serving Bhachau town, in Kutch district of Gujarat State of India. It is under Ahmedabad railway division of Western Railway zone of Indian Railways. It is located on Gandhidham–Ahmedabad main line.

It is located at 44 m above sea level and has three platforms. In 2016, electrified double broad-gauge railway lines exist and 30 trains stopped. Kandla Airport is 35 kilometres away.

References

Ahmedabad railway division
Railway stations in Kutch district